Gallade or Galladé may refer to:

 Chantal Galladé (born 1972), Swiss politician
 Gallade (Pokémon), a Pokémon species